Dashti-ye Khan (also Romanized as Dashtī-ye Khān; also known as Dasht-e Khan) is a village in Sabzdasht Rural District, in the Central District of Bafq County, Yazd Province, Iran. At the 2006 census, its population was 16, in 6 families.

References 

Populated places in Bafq County